Joanne Jackson may refer to:
Joanne Jackson (swimmer) (born 1986), British swimmer
Joanne Jackson (Coronation Street), former character on Coronation Street
JoAnne Bratton-Jackson, soul music executive and former wife of Johnny Bratton, boxer